The APS underwater assault rifle (APS stands for Avtomat Podvodny Spetsialnyy (Автомат Подводный Специальный) or "Special Underwater Assault Rifle") is an underwater firearm designed by the Soviet Union in the early 1970s. It was adopted in 1975. Made by the Tula Arms Plant (Тульский Оружейный Завод, Tul'skiy Oruzheynyy Zavod) in Russia, it is exported by Rosoboronexport.

Under water, ordinary bullets are inaccurate and have a very short range. The APS fires a 120 mm (4.75 in) long 5.66 mm calibre steel bolt specially designed for this weapon. Its magazine holds 26 rounds. The APS's barrel is not rifled; the fired projectile is kept in line by hydrodynamic effects; as a result, the APS is somewhat inaccurate when fired out of water.

The APS has a longer range and more penetrating power than spearguns. This is useful in such situations such as shooting an opposing diver through a reinforced dry suit, a protective helmet (whether air-holding or not), thick tough parts of breathing sets and their harnesses, and the plastic casings and transparent covers of some small underwater vehicles.

The APS is more powerful than a pistol, but is bulkier, heavier and takes longer to aim, particularly swinging its long barrel and large flat magazine sideways through water.

History

The rising threat of attacks by frogmen in naval bases caused various anti-frogman techniques to be developed. In the USSR, one of these techniques was guard frogmen sent to stop the attackers. At first these guard frogmen were armed only with knives and AK-type rifles. The rifle was carried in a waterproof case and could be used only on the surface, so the only effective underwater weapon against enemy frogmen was the knife.

The SPP-1 underwater pistol was accepted in 1971, but soon proved to be useful for close-up self-defence rather than in attacking more distant targets. Vladimir Simonov undertook the job of developing an underwater assault rifle. To allow the rifle's mechanism to work under water, there had to be room for the flow of the water pushed aside by moving parts and by the gas produced by the propellant explosive in the cartridge. The APS rifle was accepted for use in the mid-1970s. One special improvement was a perforated gas tube, and in the sighting. Its design engineer received a state award in 1983.

As with the SPP-1 the first stage of the work was to develop a cartridge. Another cartridge version was designed that contained a miniature rocket, which when fired makes a visible streak in the water. Next, Vladimir Simonov designed the rifle. The objective was ambitious; nobody had ever before tried to build a functioning automatic underwater firearm. The most important problem was designing a receiver that could work under water. Water is essentially incompressible, so the structure had to let water move around easily; as a result, its receiver is open at the rear. Since it operates on the principle of gas discharge, it has a gas controller to let it work both underwater and on land.

The APS was adopted in the mid-1970s. Afterwards, there was lengthy improvement work on the APS. One improvement was fitting a perforated gas pipe with a special shield to break up the emitted gas bubbles, making targeting easier and reducing the visibility of the bubbles, allowing stealthier firing of the weapon.

The APS was the primary weapon of Soviet frogmen and Serbian river flotilla frogmen.

However, since the conception of this new weapon there were objections. It was the perfect weapon for the Soviet frogmen's underwater operations, but it was less useful for Spetsnaz soldiers fighting both on land and underwater. The APS can operate on land, but its effective range does not exceed 50 metres, and the rifle's lifetime drops to 180 shots in air from 2,000 shots underwater. Therefore, they mostly carried a SPP-1 pistol for self-defence under water and an AK-74 to fight on land. At the end of the 1980s the ASM-DT amphibious rifle was developed.

Users

 
 
 : Used by MARCOS commandos.
 
 
 : by the 82nd River Underwater Demolition Company of the 72nd Brigade for Special Operations

See also

Bibliography

 Piotr Taras „Strzałki” dla płetwonurków, Komandos 9/93. 
 Zbigniew Gwóźdź, Strzały pod wodą, Komandos 7/8/96. 
 Leszek Erenfeicht, Rosyjska broń strzelecka dla płetwonurków, Strzał 5/2003. 
 Wiktor Suworow, Specnaz. Historia sił specjalnych Armii Radzieckiej, Wydawnictwo Adamski i Bieliński, Warszawa 1999.

References

External links
A real APS used in filming game footage for the Call of Duty: Ghosts videogame.

Assault rifles of the Soviet Union
Soviet inventions
Cold War firearms of the Soviet Union
Underwater rifles
Tula Arms Plant products
Flechette firearms
Military equipment introduced in the 1970s